Jonathan F. Manley Sr. is a former member of the New Hampshire House of Representatives.

Career
Manley has worked as a teacher and as the clerk of the Bennington Conservation Commission. On November 6, 2012, Manley was first elected to the New Hampshire House of Representatives where he represented the Hillsborough 3 district. He served in this capacity from December 5, 2012 to December 5, 2018. He is a Democrat.

Personal life
Manley resides in Bennington, New Hampshire.

References

Living people
Educators from New Hampshire
People from Hillsborough County, New Hampshire
Democratic Party members of the New Hampshire House of Representatives
21st-century American politicians
Year of birth missing (living people)